Valarm is a technology company that makes software for remote monitoring and Industrial IoT.

The company was founded in 2012 by two brothers: Lorenzo Gonzalez and Edward Pultar. Valarm is based in the Los Angeles area of California, USA.

Valarm has assisted government agencies deploying remote monitoring systems, including:
 Air quality and pollution monitoring with South Coast Air Quality Management District (SC - AQMD), the government agency responsible for air quality monitoring and compliance in Southern California
 Flood monitoring systems for measuring water levels in Virginia Beach, Virginia
 Monitoring temperatures and other environmental sensors for agriculture and vineyards
 Early warning systems, monitoring water levels risks, and flooding in Newport News, Virginia

References 

2012 establishments in California